The Women's Marathon at the 1993 World Championships in Stuttgart, Germany, was held on Sunday August 15, 1993.

Medalists

Abbreviations
All times shown are in hours:minutes:seconds

Records

Intermediates

Final ranking

See also
 Women's Olympic Marathon (1992)
 1993 Marathon Year Ranking

References
 Results

M
Marathons at the World Athletics Championships
1993 marathons
Women's marathons
World Championships in Athletics marathon
Marathons in Germany